The 2012 Alabama Crimson Tide softball team was an American softball team, representing the University of Alabama for the 2012 NCAA softball season. The Crimson Tide played its home games at Rhoads Stadium. The 2012 team made the postseason for the 14th straight year, and the Women's College World Series for eighth time. This season represented the 16th season of softball in the school's history. Alabama won its first softball National Championship, defeating Oklahoma in three games. They became the first team in the Southeastern Conference to win the Women's College World Series.

Roster 

2012 Alabama Crimson Tide Softball Roster

Schedule 

|-
!colspan=9| Mardi Gras Invitational

|-
!colspan=9| SEC/ACC/Big 12 Challenge

|-
!colspan=9|

|-
!colspan=9|Easton Bama Bash Presented by DRASH

|-
!colspan=9|Alabama Invite

|-
!colspan=9|

|-
!colspan=9|Easton Alabama Challenge

|-
!colspan=9|

|-
!colspan=9|SEC tournament

|-
!colspan=9| NCAA Tuscaloosa Regional

|-
!colspan=9| NCAA Tuscaloosa Super Regional

|-
!colspan=9| Women's College World Series

Ranking movement

Awards and honors 

 Patrick Murphy
 SEC Coach of the Year
 NFCA South Region Coaching Staff of the Year (Along with Alyson Habetz, Stephanie VanBrakle, Adam Arbor, Kate Harris & Whitney Larsen)
 NFCA Division I National Coaching Staff of the Year (Along with Alyson Habetz, Stephanie VanBrakle, Adam Arbor, Kate Harris & Whitney Larsen))

 Cassie Reilly-Boccia
 Preseason All-SEC team
 Second Team All-SEC
 SEC All-Defensive Team
 Lowe's Senior CLASS Award; Finalist

 Kayla Braud
 Preseason All-SEC team
 USA Softball Player of the Year; Top 25 Finalist
 Second Team All-SEC
 WCWS All Tournament Team

 Kendall Dawson
 Second Team All-SEC
 SEC All-Defensive Team

 Jennifer Fenton
 SEC Player of the Week; March 19
 First Team All-SEC
 SEC Scholar-Athlete of the Year
 NFCA Third Team All-American
 Easton NCAA Division I Second Team All-American
 WCWS All Tournament Team

 Kaila Hunt
 SEC Softball Player of the Week; April 2
 First Team All-SEC
 NFCA Second Team All American
 Easton NCAA Division I First Team All-American

 Amanda Locke
 Preseason All-SEC team
 SEC Softball Player of the Week; February 13 & April 23
 Second Team All-SEC
 NFCA Second Team All-American
 Easton NCAA Division I First Team All-American
 WCWS All Tournament Team

 Jazlyn Lunceford
 Second Team All-SEC
 SEC All-Defensive Team

 Jackie Traina
 Preseason All-SEC team
 USA Softball Player of the Year; Top 10 Finalist
 SEC Pitcher of the Week; March 19, April 2 & April 9
 First Team All-SEC
 SEC Pitcher of the Year
 NFCA First Team All-American
 Easton NCAA Division I First Team All-American
 WCWS Most Valuable Player

See also 
 2012 Alabama Crimson Tide baseball team

References 

Alabama
Alabama Crimson Tide softball seasons
Alabama Crimson Tide softball season
Women's College World Series seasons
Alabama
NCAA Division I softball tournament seasons